McMillan is a full-service marketing agency based in Ottawa, Ontario, Canada. McMillan specializes in planning and executing integrated product and service branding campaigns across a variety of media, including online, broadcast, and print.

History
Founded in 1996 by Gordon McMillan, the agency has grown to service accounts throughout North America. Within six months of opening, McMillan landed accounts with Microsoft and Cognos. The following year it added several clients in the high-tech industry, including Oracle University, PeopleSoft, and Nortel Networks. D&B (Dun & Bradstreet) selected McMillan as a preferred marketing vendor in 2003 and McMillan became D&B's lead agency until 2010.

Overview
The agency had relationships with Getty Images and American Greetings. In 2007, McMillan deepened its relationship with Canada Post, becoming its primary source for interactive and web services, as well as becoming a principle marketing partner for the Canadian Medical Association (CMA). In late 2007, McMillan closed its Vancouver office, which had been operating for 5 years, servicing mainly smaller, Vancouver-based accounts. In 2011, it closed its client services center in San Francisco, CA.

Recognition
McMillan was named agency of record for Forest Products Association of Canada in 2004 and for Bridgewater Systems in 2005. 

McMillan also was named agency of record for Sophos PLC, a U.K.-based company specializing in email, web, and computer threat protection.

According to the Ottawa Business Journal, McMillan is one of Ottawa's largest marketing agencies.

References

External links
Digital Marketing
Instagram Likes

Marketing companies established in 1996
Canadian companies established in 1996
Advertising agencies of Canada
Companies based in Ottawa